Vinberg is a surname. Notable people with the surname include:

Ernest Borisovich Vinberg (1937–2020), Russian/Soviet mathematician
Fyodor Viktorovich Vinberg (1868–1927), Russian Empire officer, publisher, and journalist
Henry Vinberg, Swedish footballer
Rachelle Vinberg, American skateboarder and actress